Single-purpose may refer to:

 Singleness of Purpose, principle derived from the Fifth Tradition of Alcoholics Anonymous
 Single-purpose software
 Single-purpose knife, such as fighting knives
 Single-purpose weapon mount, for 5"/38 caliber gun

See also
 Single (disambiguation)
 Purpose (disambiguation)
 Wikipedia:Single-purpose account
 Special-purpose
 Single-use